Estelle Hecht (died in 1971) was a Jewish Canadian engraver, painter and gallerist from Montreal, Quebec. She ran the print gallery Gallery 1640 which she founded in 1961. She studied at the École des beaux-arts de Montréal and was trained by drawing professors Jacques de Tonnancour, Arthur Lismer, and Moses "Moe" Reinblatt in engraving. She died in the fire that destroyed her art gallery in 1971.

References 

Year of birth missing
1971 deaths
20th-century Canadian painters
20th-century Canadian women artists
Artists from Montreal 
Canadian art dealers
Canadian engravers
Jewish engravers
Jewish painters
Jewish women artists
Jewish Canadian artists